is a Japanese women's professional shogi player ranked 2-kyū.

Early life and becoming a women's professional shogi player
Iwasa was born in Gifu, Japan on August 15, 2005. She learned how to play shogi as a fourth-grade student due the influence of her older brothers. She subsequently began attending a local shogi school and had become good enough to enter the Tōkai branch of the Japan Shogi Association's training group system as a fifth-grade elementary school student.

Iwasa qualified for women's professional status after being promoted to training group B2 in December 2021.  Needing a sponsor to become a women's professional, her first choice was shogi professional Masayuki Toyoshima. A meeting between the two was arranged by a mutal acquaintance and Toyoshima agreed to take her on as his first apprentice. She applied for women's professional status and her application was accepted by the Japan Shogi Association; she was granted women's professional status on February 1, 2022.  she is a senior high school student and Uguisudani Junior and Senior High School in Gifu.

Promotion history
Iwasa's promotion history is as follows.

 2-kyū: February 1, 2022

Note: All ranks are women's professional ranks.

References

External links
 ShogiHub: Iwasa, Mihoko

2005 births
Living people
Japanese shogi players
Women's professional shogi players
Professional shogi players from Gifu Prefecture